Jangsan (장산) is a mountain of South Korea. It has an elevation of 634 metres Jangsan is located in Haeundae-gu in Busan.  Signs posted indicate that an active land mine field is located on the mountain.

See also
List of mountains of Korea

References

Mountains of Busan